The Irtysh–Karaganda Canal (Ertıs-Qarağandy kanaly) is an irrigation canal in Kazakhstan. It connects the Irtysh River with Karaganda (Qaraghandy), a major industrial center in north-central Kazakhstan. After Kazakhstan's independence, the canal was officially renamed as the Kanysh Satpayev Canal after the Kazakh geologist Kanysh Satpayev.

Description
It runs for 451 km in the general western, south-western, and southern direction.

Some of the canal's water is directed into the Nura (a chute below the dam at ), replenishing this river.

As Karaganda is located at a higher elevation than the Irtysh, the canal is furnished with 22 pumping stations, raising the water by 475 m in total.

History
The construction of the canal started in 1962. It was put to use by 1968, and fully completed by 1974.

In the early 21st century, a pipeline was built from the canal to the  Ishim River, to supply Kazakhstan's capital Astana with water.

As of 2013, proposals are floated in Kazakhstan about either extending the Irtysh–Karaganda Canal all the way to the Ishim River upstream of Astana, or building a new canal between the Irtysh and Astana.

According to a report published in 2013, the canal presently operates at only about one-half of its full capacity.

Notes

External links 

CIrtysh-Karaganda
Canals in Kazakhstan
Irrigation canals
Canals opened in 1968
Canals opened in 1974